Theodore Livingston (born March 5, 1963), better known as Grand Wizzard Theodore, is an American hip hop DJ. He is widely credited as the inventor of the scratching technique. In addition to scratching, he gained credibility for his mastery of needle drops and other techniques which he invented or perfected.

Early life
Born in the Bronx, New York, Theodore's brother, Mean Gene, was his mentor, who began teaching him the technique of DJing at an early age. Theodore was later apprenticed by Grandmaster Flash.

In 1975, Theodore was playing records in his bedroom with the volume all the way up. Furious with the noise, his mother entered the room and Theodore paused the record to hear his mother scold him about the volume of the music. While holding the record still, he accidentally moved it back and forth but liked the sound it made. From there on, he played with records often and developed the technique known as scratching.

A dramatization of Theodore's invention of the record scratch was featured on Comedy Central's television show Drunk History, narrated by Questlove.

Career
In the early 1980s, Theodore was a part of the group Grandwizard Theodore & the Fantastic Five. They released "Can I Get a Soul Clap" in 1982. He was also featured in the 1983 film Wild Style, as well as contributing to the film's soundtrack. He explains the origin of the scratch in the documentary, Scratch.

Legacy
Theodore's phrase "Say turn it up" from his track "Fantastic Freaks at the Dixie" was sampled by hip hop and rap acts such as Public Enemy (on the track "Bring the Noise"), Bomb the Bass (on the track "Megablast"), and many others.

References

External links
 
 
DJ Grand Wizzard Theodore Interview - NAMM Oral History Library (2012)

1963 births
Living people
American hip hop musicians
American hip hop DJs